Guy Dawnay may refer to:

Guy Dawnay (politician) (1848–1889), British soldier and Conservative politician
Guy Dawnay (British Army officer) (1878–1952), his nephew, army officer and merchant banker